Events from the year 1774 in Sweden

Incumbents
 Monarch – Gustav III

Events

 28 April – The Freedom of the press is restricted. 
 7 June - Wedding between Prince Charles and Hedvig Elisabeth Charlotte of Holstein-Gottorp.
 - Aaron Isaac emigrate to Stockholm from Germany: he is the first Jew who is granted permission to immigrate to Sweden. 
 
 
 

 Maria Christina Bruhn presents her invention, a package for gunpowder to the Royal Swedish Academy of Sciences.

Births

 11 February - Hans Järta, administrator and revolutionary  (died 1847)
 
 
 17 November - Lisa Erlandsdotter, tapestry maker (died 1854)
 Mor Kerstin i Stämmemand-Kinna, Swedish industrialist (died 1852)

Deaths

 
 31 March - Johan Peter Falk, botanist and an apostle of Carl Linnaeus (born 1733)
 
 24 September - Margaretha Donner, business woman (born 1726)

 4 October - Märta Ljungberg, innkeeper (born 1656)

References

 
Years of the 18th century in Sweden
Sweden